The Philippines  participated in the 2011 Asian Winter Games in Almaty and Astana, Kazakhstan from January 30, 2011 to February 6, 2011. The nation sent 3 athletes

Figure skating

Men

Women

References

Nations at the 2011 Asian Winter Games
Asian Winter Games
Philippines at the Asian Winter Games